KCHI may refer to:

 KCHI (AM), a radio station (1010 AM) licensed to Chillicothe, Missouri, United States
 KCHI-FM, a radio station (98.5 FM) licensed to Chillicothe, Missouri, United States